The following is a list of TT Pro League stadiums that have hosted a TT Pro League match since its inception in 1999. The Pro League serves as Trinidad and Tobago's highest level of association football and the annual league tournament has hosted matches in sixteen football stadiums. The inaugural round of Pro League matches took place on 31 March 1999 with four clubs hosting the opening fixtures.

After Trinidad and Tobago was awarded the 2001 FIFA U-17 World Championship, the country constructed four football-specific stadiums named after the country's all-time leading sportsmen: Ato Boldon, Dwight Yorke, Larry Gomes, and Manny Ramjohn. The four stadiums again played host to an international football competition with the 2010 FIFA U-17 Women's World Cup. The National Stadium, built in 1980, is the oldest and longest serving stadium in the TT Pro League. The stadium was renamed in honour of Hasely Crawford after the stadium underwent major renovation to host the semi-final, third-place, and final matches of the 2001 FIFA U–17 World Championship. Moreover, with the seating expansion the stadium is now the largest in the country with a capacity of 27,000 and serves as the current home to Morvant Caledonia United, Defence Force, Police, and St. Ann's Rangers.

In addition, TT Pro League matches have also been hosted by Marvin Lee Stadium. The Macoya-based stadium was built and opened in 1996 with a 6,000 spectator capacity and is housed together with the Dr. João Havelange Centre of Excellence. In 2007, Marvin Lee Stadium became the first Caribbean stadium to install an artificial playing surface, reportedly costing in excess of TT$8 million and was supported through a developmental grant from FIFA.

Stadiums

References

External links
Official Website
Soca Warriors Online, TT Pro League

stadia
 
TT Pro League
TT Pro League stadiums